The Little Mermaid is a Disney media franchise. The success of the 1989 American animated feature film The Little Mermaid led to a direct-to-video sequel, a prequel film, a spin-off television series, a musical, several video games, theme park attractions, and other merchandise. A live action remake of the film is in development for release in 2023. The Little Mermaid paved the way for what would become the Disney Renaissance, with the original film becoming the first film of that era.

Animated films

The Little Mermaid

The Little Mermaid is the original film of the franchise. It was produced by Walt Disney Animation Studios, and was released to theaters on November 17, 1989, by Walt Disney Pictures. It was directed by Ron Clements and John Musker, and produced by Musker and Howard Ashman. The film was a critical and commercial success. The Little Mermaid is the 28th Disney animated feature film and belongs to an era known as the Disney Renaissance. It is based on Hans Christian Andersen's 1837 fairy tale of the same name. In 2022, The Little Mermaid was selected for preservation in the National Film Registry by the Library of Congress for being "culturally, historically, or aesthetically significant".

The Little Mermaid II: Return to the Sea

The Little Mermaid II: Return to the Sea is a direct-to-video sequel to the first film. It was released by Walt Disney Studios Home Entertainment on VHS in the United States on September 19, 2000. It was directed by Jim Kammerud and Brian Smith, and produced by Leslie Hough and David Lovegren. In 2006, the film was bundled together with the original film in the Region 2 release. The original DVD release has been discontinued. A special edition DVD with a deleted song, "Gonna Get My Wish", and a new game was released on December 16, 2008. Unlike its predecessor, The Little Mermaid II: Return to the Sea received generally negative reviews from critics, with the criticism reserved for the film being a repetition of the first film.

The Little Mermaid: Ariel's Beginning

The Little Mermaid: Ariel's Beginning is a direct-to-video prequel to the original film. The film was released on Region 1 DVD in the United States on August 26, 2008, and on Region 2 DVD in Europe on September 22, 2008. It was directed by Peggy Holmes and produced by Kendra Halland. The film contains special features including deleted scenes, a production featurette hosted by the director, games and activities, and a featurette hosted by Sierra Boggess about the Broadway musical. The Little Mermaid: Ariel's Beginning received mixed reviews, with praise given to the animation quality, but the film's music and new villain, Marina Del Rey, were criticized for being inferior to those found in the original film.

Live-action film

In May 2016, Deadline Hollywood reported that Disney was in early development for a live-action adaptation of the film. Three months later, it was announced that Alan Menken would return as the film's composer and write new songs alongside Lin-Manuel Miranda, who will also co-produce the movie with Marc Platt. In December 2018, Rob Marshall was officially hired as director for the film.

Halle Bailey was cast in the starring role as Ariel, and Jonah Hauer-King was cast as Prince Eric. Javier Bardem plays her father King Triton, while Melissa McCarthy, Jacob Tremblay, and Nora "Awkwafina" Lum portray Ursula, Flounder, and a gender-swapped Scuttle, respectively. 

Principal photography was originally scheduled to begin in April 2020, but production on the film was temporarily halted in March 2020 due to the COVID-19 pandemic. Filming was expected to begin as early as July or August 2020. Ultimately filming had finally begun by the end of January 2021, at Pinewood Studios in Iver, England. Additional filming took place in Sardinia for a total of "roughly three months" in the summer of 2021. Filming was completed on July 11, 2021. The film is scheduled to be released on May 26, 2023.

Television

The Little Mermaid TV series

Disney's The Little Mermaid is an animated television series featuring the adventures of Ariel as a mermaid prior to the events of the first film. This series is the first Disney television series to be spun off from a major animated film. The Little Mermaid premiered in the fall of 1992 with the animated prime time special called "A Whale of a Tale", then moved to Saturday mornings. This series originally appeared on CBS, with an original run from 1992 to 1994. It was later shown in reruns on The Disney Channel and Toon Disney. Some of the episodes contain musical segments, featuring original songs written for the series. The opening theme to the show is a combination of the songs "Part of Your World", "Under the Sea" and "Kiss the Girl".

Shorts featuring Sebastian
A series of shorts starring Sebastian were aired as part of another Disney Saturday morning series for CBS, Marsupilami, which ran from 1993 to 1995.

The Little Mermaid Live!

On May 16, 2017, ABC announced that it planned to air The Wonderful World of Disney: The Little Mermaid Live, on October 3, 2017, which would have featured a broadcast of the film with a similar concert format (aiming to appeal to the recent trend of live made-for-TV productions of Broadway musicals on television). However, on August 3, 2017, it was announced that the special had been dropped due to budget issues. On August 5, 2019, ABC announced that the project was revived and would air November 5 of that year with Auliʻi Cravalho, Queen Latifah and Shaggy starring as Ariel, Ursula and Sebastian, respectively. The cast also included John Stamos as Chef Louis, Amber Riley as Daughters of Triton Emcee and Graham Phillips as Prince Eric. The special featured music from both the film and the Tony Award-nominated Broadway adaptation and would be performed in front of a live audience with giant projection surface. The show was produced by Done+Dusted with director-executive producer Hamish Hamilton and executive producer Richard Kraft and is still expected to be ABC's first live musical. The air date was selected to allow the program to have advertising for the November 12, 2019 launch of Disney+ streaming service and to mark the film's 30th anniversary. Jodi Benson introduced the special.

Stage musical

A pre-Broadway stage version premiered in September 2007 in Denver, Colorado, at the Ellie Caulkins Opera House, with music by Alan Menken, new lyrics by Glenn Slater, and a book by Doug Wright. The musical began performances on Broadway at the Lunt-Fontanne Theatre on November 3, 2007, and officially opened on January 10, 2008.
The original cast featured Sierra Boggess as Ariel, Norm Lewis as King Triton, Sherie Rene Scott as Ursula, Eddie Korbich as Scuttle, Tituss Burgess as Sebastian, Sean Palmer as Prince Eric, Jonathan Freeman as Grimsby, Derrick Baskin as Jetsam, Tyler Maynard as Flotsam, Cody Hanford and J.J. Singleton as Flounder, and John Treacy Egan as Chef Louis. Notable replacements included Faith Prince as Ursula and Drew Seeley as Eric.

The show closed on Broadway August 30, 2009, after 685 performances and 50 previews.

Video games
There are several video games based on the films, and the characters have made appearances in other crossover video games.

The Little Mermaid video game

The Little Mermaid the video game was developed by Capcom for the NES and Game Boy, and published in 1991. It is a single player side-scrolling action game where the player controls Ariel on a quest to defeat Ursula. Ariel has already met Eric, and they plan to wed, but Ursula has taken control of the ocean. So Ariel (After explaining what's going on to Eric) becomes a mermaid once more and sets off to rescue the sea. The game takes place from a side view and Ariel (swimming most of the time, but hopping around on the land occasionally) can shoot bubbles to trap her foes and can then throw them at each other. She can also dig through sand to find treasure and pick up sea shells to break chests open with. The treasure she finds in the sand is usually just bonus points, but the treasure you find in chests will increase your bubble's power and range. The gameplay is similar to other Capcom games such as Chip 'n Dale Rescue Rangers and DuckTales in that Ariel shoots air bubbles from her tail that when they hit certain enemies, can be picked up and thrown at other enemies or bosses. Ariel can also collect icons scattered throughout the levels to restore health, gain extra lives, or increase the range/power of her air bubbles.

There are some differences between the NES and the Game Boy versions. When a stage begins, Ariel descends from the top of the screen to the recommended starting point in the NES version, but just starts out in the recommended position in the Game Boy version. The featured SFX are different in both versions. The start of the stage's BGM can be heard only once in the NES version; although the whole BGM can be repeated in the Game Boy version. The stage backgrounds were more restricted in the Game Boy version than in the NES version. When you lose a heart, the heart turns into a heart frame in the NES version, but disappears in the Game Boy version. The key scales of the Boss BGM are different in both versions. The BGM speed in the NES version is much faster than in the Game Boy version.

Ariel the Little Mermaid

Ariel the Little Mermaid is a video game published by Sega in 1992 for the Mega Drive/Genesis and Game Gear (a Sega Master System version was released by Tec Toy in Brazil). The game lets the player control either Ariel or King Triton to defeat Ursula. Rescuing requires the player to simply swim into the unfortunate little victims as they hang about at fixed places in the watery world; while fending off and dodging enemies like eels, clams, sharks, and several other sea meanies. Friends like Flounder and Sebastian can also be summoned for a little helping hand.

The Little Mermaid Pinball

The Little Mermaid Pinball is based on The Little Mermaid. It is a Windows pinball video game developed by Disney Online. It was released worldwide in multiple languages, including English, German, French, Italian, and Spanish.

The Little Mermaid: Magic in Two Kingdoms
The Little Mermaid: Magic in Two Kingdoms, by Buena Vista Games, was released for the Game Boy Advance. A The Little Mermaid hand-held LCD game from Tiger Electronics was also released in 1993.

Ariel's Story Studio Create, Learn and Play In A Living World 
It's an animated storybook that was released on November 25, 1997. It's a PC game and it's an interactive storybook where you can create your own story and allows the player to create their own little story through words and pictures.

The Little Mermaid 2: Pinball Frenzy

The Little Mermaid 2: Pinball Frenzy is based on The Little Mermaid II: Return to the Sea. It is a pinball video game developed by Left Field Productions and published by Nintendo for the Game Boy Color handheld video game console. It was first released in North America and was later released in PAL regions.

Disney's The Little Mermaid: Ariel's Undersea Adventure
Disney's The Little Mermaid: Ariel's Undersea Adventure was released on the Nintendo DS on October 2, 2006.

Kingdom Hearts series
Characters and the setting from the first film appear in Disney/Square's Kingdom Hearts series of video games. Atlantica appears as a world in Kingdom Hearts, Kingdom Hearts: Chain of Memories and Kingdom Hearts II, where Ariel appears as a party member in the first game, while Ursula is the boss in the world and one of the members of Maleficent's inner circle. Other characters from the film also make appearances. Urusla returns as a boss in Kingdom Hearts 3D: Dream Drop Distance, while Ariel returns as a character to summon in Kingdom Hearts III.

Ariel's Musical Surprise
Ariel's Musical Surprise, was released on iOS and published by Disney Mobile Studios on October 10, 2013.

The Little Mermaid: Undersea Treasures
The Little Mermaid: Undersea Treasures, a hidden object PC game by Microsoft Studios was released in a preview playable form on December 20, 2013, with plans for further game options in the future.

Disney Magic Kingdoms
In the world builder video game Disney Magic Kingdoms, Eric's castle appear as part of the environment. A limited time Event based on The Little Mermaid introduced Ariel, Prince Eric, Flounder, Sebastian, Scuttle, King Triton and Ursula as playable characters, as well as Atlantica, Ariel's Grotto, Ursula's Lair and Under the Sea as attractions. In the game the characters are involved in new storylines that serve as a continuation of The Little Mermaid (ignoring other material in the franchise).

Other media
Several attractions based on The Little Mermaid have been released. Mermaid Lagoon at Tokyo DisneySea is a themed land made to look like the Palace of King Triton and features fanciful seashell-inspired architecture. It includes the meet-and-greet attraction Ariel's Grotto, as well as the parachute jump–style ride Jumpin' Jellyfish (also present in Disney California Adventure). King Triton's Carousel of the Sea is a Carousel at Disney California Adventure that uses sea horses, flying fish, whales, dolphins, sea lions, otters and garibaldi. Voyage of the Little Mermaid is a live show attraction at Disney Hollywood Studios in Florida that features puppets and live actors. Other attractions based on the film include The Little Mermaid: Ariel's Undersea Adventure, a dark ride at Disney California Adventure in Paradise Pier and the Magic Kingdom in Fantasyland.

Ariel is part of the Disney Princess franchise, an extensive line of merchandise that includes dolls, sing-along videos, and a variety of other children's products, apparel, and even adhesive bandages. Ursula, on the other hand, is part of the official line-up of the Disney Villains franchise.

Many characters from the franchise appear in the Disney Channel series Disney's House of Mouse.  Some of them also appear in the series' spin-off film Mickey's Magical Christmas: Snowed in at the House of Mouse, and Ursula appears as one of the main villains in Mickey's House of Villains. The characters also appear at Walt Disney Parks and Resorts as a meet and greet characters.

Ariel appears in Sofia the First: The Floating Palace,  a television special that was aired as part of the series Sofia the First and released on Region 1 DVD on November 24, 2013.

The Disney Wish cruise ship of the Disney Cruise Line has a live show adaptation of the film that premiered in 2022.

Printed adaptations
Disney Comics released a four-issue "The Little Mermaid Limited Series" comic series and two issues of "Sebastian from The Little Mermaid" comics in 1992. Marvel Comics released its own title, "Disney's The Little Mermaid" in 1994, which ran for twelve issues. All the comics are prequels to the film, and feature Ariel still a mermaid living under the sea.

A series of twelve prequel novels were published in 1994, following the adventures of young Ariel living under the sea with her sisters and father. The titles are: "Green-Eyed Pearl" and "Nefazia Visits the Palace" by Suzanne Weyn; "Reflections of Arsulu" and "The Same Old Song" by Marilyn Kaye; "Arista's New Boyfriend" and "Ariel the Spy" by M. J. Carr; "King Triton, Beware!", "The Haunted Palace" and "The Boyfriend Mix-Up" by Katherine Applegate; "The Practical-Joke War" by Stephanie St. Pierre; "The Dolphins of Coral Cove" by K. S. Rodriguez; and "Alana's Secret Friend" by Jess Christopher. Also published in 1994 is "Tales from Under the Sea", an illustrated book containing 22 stories and poems about the characters from the film.

In 2009 Disney Press started a young adult novel series retelling various films of the animated Disney canon but set from the point of view of its villains. The novels are written by Serena Valentino, and the third entry in the series was Poor Unfortunate Soul: A Tale of the Sea Witch, which was released in July 2016.

Common elements

Plot and themes
Ariel, a beautiful sixteen-year-old mermaid princess, is dissatisfied with life under the sea and curious about the human world, despite her father, King Triton who holds a grudge against humans. One night, Ariel, her best friend Flounder and an unwilling Sebastian travel to the ocean surface to watch a celebration for the birthday of Prince Eric, with whom Ariel falls in love. A sudden storm hits, and Eric almost drowns saving his dog Max but is saved by Ariel, who drags him to the beach. She sings to him but dives underwater when Max returns to Eric. Upon waking, Eric has a vague impression that he was rescued by a girl with a beautiful voice; he vows to find her, and Ariel vows to find a way to join Eric.

Triton and his daughters notice a change in Ariel, who is openly lovesick. Triton questions Sebastian about Ariel's behavior, during which Sebastian accidentally reveals the incident with Eric. Triton furiously confronts Ariel in her grotto, using his trident to destroy her collection of human treasures. After Triton leaves, a pair of eels, Flotsam and Jetsam, convince a crying Ariel that she must visit Ursula the sea witch, if she wants all of her dreams to come true. Ursula makes a deal with Ariel to transform her into a human for three days. Within these three days, Ariel must receive the 'kiss of true love' from Eric; otherwise, she will transform back into a mermaid on the third day and belong to Ursula. As payment for legs, Ariel has to give up her voice, which Ursula takes by magically removing the energy from Ariel's vocal cords and storing it in a nautilus shell.

Eric and Max find Ariel on the beach. He initially suspects that she is the one who saved his life, but when he learns that she cannot speak, he discards that notion. Nonetheless, Ariel spends time with Eric, and at the end of the second day, they almost kiss but are thwarted by Flotsam and Jetsam. Angered at their narrow escape, Ursula takes the disguise of a beautiful young woman named "Vanessa" and appears onshore singing with Ariel's voice. Eric recognizes the song and, in her disguise, Vanessa/Ursula casts a hypnotic enchantment on Eric to make him forget about Ariel. The next day, Ariel finds out that Eric will be married to the disguised Ursula on a ship. She cries and is left behind when the wedding barge departs. Scuttle discovers that Vanessa is Ursula in disguise, and informs Ariel. As Ariel and Flounder chase the wedding barge, Sebastian informs Triton, and Scuttle is assigned to literally "stall the wedding." With the help of various animals, the nautilus shell around Ursula's neck is broken, restoring Ariel's voice and breaking Ursula's enchantment over Eric. Realizing that Ariel was the girl who saved his life, Eric rushes to kiss her, but the sun sets and Ariel transforms back into a mermaid. Ursula reverts to her true form and kidnaps Ariel.

Triton appears and confronts Ursula, but cannot destroy Ursula's contract with Ariel. Triton chooses to sacrifice himself for his daughter, and is transformed into a polyp. Ursula takes Triton's crown and trident, which was her plan from the beginning. Ursula uses her new power to gloat, transforming into a giant, and forming a whirlpool that disturbs several shipwrecks to the surface, one of which Eric commandeers. Just as Ursula is set to use the trident to destroy Ariel, Eric turns the wheel hard to port and runs Ursula through the abdomen with the ship's splintered bowsprit, mortally wounding her. With Ursula gone, her power breaks and the polyps in Ursula's garden (including Triton) turn back into the old merpeople. Later, after seeing that Ariel really loves Eric and that Eric also saved him in the process, Triton willingly changes her from a mermaid into a human using his trident. She runs into Eric's arms, and the two finally get married.

The plot of The Little Mermaid II: Return to the Sea focuses on Ariel's daughter Melody who longs to be a part of the ocean world and is ultimately manipulated by Ursula's vengeful sister, Morgana, into stealing the Trident for her. The film is essentially a re-telling of the first film, to the point that Morgana has two manta ray cohorts very similar to Flotsam and Jetsam, desires the trident and revenge against Triton, and is even voiced by Pat Carroll.

The Little Mermaid: Ariel's Beginning is set before the events of the original film, in which King Triton has banned music from Atlantica, and Ariel, her sisters, Sebastian and Flounder rebel against this new law while a greedy palace official, Marina Del Rey, seeks to claim Sebastian's position for herself.

Cast and characters

Crew

Development

History
The Little Mermaid was originally planned as part of one of Walt Disney's earliest feature films, a proposed package film featuring vignettes of Hans Christian Andersen tales.  Development started soon after Snow White and the Seven Dwarfs in the late 1930s, but was put on hold due to various circumstances.

In 1985, The Great Mouse Detective co-director Ron Clements discovered a collection of Andersen's fairy tales while browsing a bookstore. He presented a two-page draft of a movie based on "The Little Mermaid" to CEO Michael Eisner and Walt Disney Studios chairman Jeffrey Katzenberg at a "gong show" idea suggestion meeting. Eisner and Katzenberg passed the project over, because at that time the studio was in development on a sequel to their live-action mermaid comedy Splash (1984) and felt The Little Mermaid would be too similar a project. The next day, however, Walt Disney Studios chairman Katzenberg greenlit the idea for possible development. While in production in the 1980s, the staff found, by chance, original story and visual development work done by Kay Nielsen for Disney's proposed 1930s Anderson feature. Many of the changes made by the staff in the 1930s to Hans Christian Andersen's original story were coincidentally the same as the changes made by Disney writers in the 1980s. That year, Clements and Great Mouse Detective co-director John Musker expanded the two-page idea into a 20-page rough script, eliminating the role of the mermaid's grandmother and expanding the roles of the Merman King and the sea witch.

Music
In 1987, songwriter Howard Ashman became involved with the writing and development of Mermaid after he was asked to contribute a song to Oliver & Company. He proposed changing the minor character Clarence, the English-butler crab, to a Jamaican Rastafarian crab and shifting the music style throughout the film to reflect this. At the same time, Katzenberg, Clements, Musker, and Ashman revised the story format to make Mermaid a musical with a Broadway-style story structure, with the song sequences serving as the tentpoles of the film. Ashman and composer Alan Menken, both noted for their work as the writers of the successful Off-Broadway stage musical Little Shop of Horrors, teamed up to compose the entire song score.

The first film's soundtrack, The Little Mermaid: An Original Walt Disney Records Soundtrack contains the songs from the film written by Menken and Ashman, as well as the film's score composed by Menken. The album received the Academy Award for Best Original Score and the Golden Globe Award for Best Original Score. As of February 2007, the album is certified 6× Platinum by the RIAA. In 2010, Rhapsody (online music service) called it one of the all-time great Disney and Pixar Soundtracks. To commemorate the film's 25th anniversary, an extended version of the soundtrack will be released on November 24, 2014, under the Walt Disney Records: The Legacy Collection.

Apart from the soundtrack, The Little Mermaid has inspired several more albums. Sebastian from The Little Mermaid and Sebastian: Party Gras! contain songs are cover versions of calypso or reggae songs.  All of the songs are performed by Samuel E. Wright as Sebastian the crab with the exception of "Dancing Mood" and "Dance the Day Away", which are performed by Jodi Benson as Ariel, who also joins Sebastian on "Day-O". Jason Marin plays the speaking role of Flounder in the beginning of some tracks. The Little Mermaid: Songs from the Sea is a concept album; listening to the tracks in order will present the story of a typical day in the life of the mermaid Ariel (set sometime before the events of the first film).

Disney's The Little Mermaid: Original Broadway Cast Recording is the cast album for the musical The Little Mermaid. It features performances from the show's cast, which includes Tituss Burgess, Sherie Rene Scott, Norm Lewis, Eddie Korbich, and newcomer Sierra Boggess as Ariel, the little mermaid.

Notes

References

External links 

Return to the Sea
Ariel's Beginning

 
Film series introduced in 1989
Animated film series
Walt Disney Studios (division) franchises
Tiger Electronics handheld games
Little Mermaid (franchise)